The American crocodile (Crocodylus acutus) is a species of crocodilian found in the Neotropics. It is the most widespread of the four extant species of crocodiles from the Americas, with populations present from South Florida and the coasts of Mexico to as far south as Peru and Venezuela.

The habitat of the American crocodile consists largely of coastal areas. It is also found in river systems, but tends to prefer salinity, resulting in the species congregating in brackish lakes, mangrove swamps, lagoons, cays, and small islands. Other crocodiles also have tolerance to saltwater due to salt glands underneath the tongue, but the American crocodile is the only species other than the saltwater crocodile to commonly live and thrive in saltwater. They can be found on beaches and small island formations without any freshwater source, such as many cays and islets across the Caribbean. They are also found in hypersaline lakes; one of the largest known populations inhabits Lago Enriquillo in the Dominican Republic.

The American crocodile is one of the largest crocodile species. As with other crocodile species, females are smaller, rarely exceeding  in length even in the largest-bodied population.

Like any other large crocodilian, the American crocodile is potentially dangerous to humans, but it tends not to be as aggressive as some other species. American crocodiles coexist with the American alligator in Florida, and with the smaller spectacled caiman within Central America and South America.

Taxonomy and etymology

The American crocodile was described by Georges Cuvier in 1807, and became known as the "sharp-snout alligator". In 1822, Constantine Samuel Rafinesque postulated that the species was in fact a crocodile.

The species was redescribed as Crocodylus floridanus by William Temple Hornaday in 1875, when Hornaday and C. E. Jackson were sent to Florida to collect alligator hides. Upon hearing of a "big old gator" in Arch Creek at the head of Biscayne Bay, Hornaday and his companions searched for it and reported:

In a few hours, we got sight of him, out on the bank in a saw-grass wallow. He was a monster for size—a perfect whale of a saurian, gray in color—and by all the powers, he was a genuine crocodile!

Crocodylus floridanus is now considered an invalid junior synonym of C. acutus.

Evolution 
Until 2020, the evolution of the American crocodile was poorly understood. However, the discovery of the Miocene species Crocodylus checchiai indicates that it, the Orinoco crocodile (Crocodylus intermedius), Morelet's crocodile (C. moreletii), and the Cuban crocodile (C. rhombifer) all share an ancestor hailing from Africa. The newly discovered animal may also represent the base of the evolutionary radiation of these animals, representing the missing link between crocodiles in Africa and the Americas.

The genus Crocodylus likely originated in Africa and radiated outwards towards Southeast Asia and the Americas, although an Australia/Asia origin has also been considered. Phylogenetic evidence supports Crocodylus diverging from its closest recent relative, the extinct Voay of Madagascar, around 25 million years ago, near the Oligocene/Miocene boundary. American crocodile populations in Florida, Jamaica and Hispaniola (in the Dominican Republic) differ in gene frequencies.

Below is a cladogram based on a 2018 tip dating study by Lee & Yates simultaneously using morphological, molecular (DNA sequencing), and stratigraphic (fossil age) data, as revised by the 2021 Hekkala et al. paleogenomics study using DNA extracted from the extinct Voay.

Characteristics
 

The American crocodile is a highly fecund species (38 clutch of eggs; fecundity over 20 after 15 years old) with a high adult survival rate and long life span. Like all true crocodilians, the American crocodile is a quadruped, with four short, stocky legs; a long, powerful tail; and a scaly hide with rows of ossified scutes running down its back and tail. Its snout is elongated and includes a strong pair of jaws. Its eyes have nictitating membranes for protection, along with lacrimal glands, which produce tears.

The nostrils, eyes, and ears are situated on the top of its head, so the rest of the body can be concealed underwater for surprise attacks. Camouflage also helps it prey on food. The snout is longer and narrower than that of the American alligator, but broader on average than that of the Orinoco crocodile. American crocodiles are also paler and more grayish than the relatively dark-hued American alligator. This crocodile species normally crawls on its belly, but it can also "high walk".

Adults have a uniform grayish-green coloration with white or yellow undersides, while juveniles have dark cross-banding on the tail and back.

 The American crocodile is sometimes confused with the Morelet's crocodile, a smaller species that is native to Mexico.

Size
With extensive conservation efforts underway, there appears to be an increase in the number of large American crocodiles in Florida, some of the largest reportedly exceeding  in length. Large adults of this species are capable of reaching  in weight, ranking it among the largest living crocodilians in the Neotropical realm. Exceptionally large specimens may arguably exceed , possibly reaching or exceeding , but such specimens are unverified and possibly dubious although some are arguably supported by size projections from skull lengths.

Distribution and habitat

The American crocodile is the most widespread of the four extant species of crocodiles from the Americas. They are saltwater-tolerant, and have thus been capable of colonizing a multitude of islands within the Caribbean, and on some coastal Pacific islands as well. They inhabit waters such as mangrove swamps, river mouths, fresh waters, and salt lakes, and can even be found at sea, hence their wide distribution throughout southern Florida, the Greater Antilles (excluding Puerto Rico and Isla de la Juventud, where they are replaced by the introduced spectacled caiman), Martinique, southern Mexico (including the Yucatán Peninsula), Central America, and the South American countries of Colombia, Peru, Venezuela (including on Margarita Island), and Ecuador. The American crocodile is especially plentiful in Costa Rica.

American crocodiles coexist with the smaller spectacled caiman within Central America. The only other crocodiles present within the American crocodile's range are the Morelet's crocodile, and the critically endangered Cuban and Orinoco crocodiles. In addition, an American/Cuban crocodile hybrid was recently discovered in the Cancún area of Mexico. The crocodile likely originated in the Zapata Swamp of Cuba (the only place where these wild hybrids exist, and where the two species are sympatric), and swam to the Yucatán Peninsula.

Caribbean

One of its largest documented populations (the largest in the Caribbean) is in Lago Enriquillo, a hypersaline lake in the Dominican Republic. In Haiti, the only population known is in the brackish lake Etang Saumâtre, where the population is nearing extirpation due to overhunting and poaching. In Jamaica, the species inhabits most of the swamps available, as well as brackish portions of rivers. American crocodiles have recently been sighted in Grand Cayman, leading experts to believe the species may be swimming from Cuba (which is home to a large American crocodile population) and slowly repopulating Grand Cayman.

Florida
The American crocodile's saline tolerance may have allowed it to colonize limited portions of the United States, particularly southern Florida. Contrary to popular misinformation, the presence of the American alligator is not the reason the American crocodile was unable to populate brackish waters north of Florida, but rather the climate, as crocodiles are less tolerant of cold. Within the United States, the American crocodile's distribution is generally limited to the southern tip of Florida, though at least two have been found as far north as the Tampa Bay area. They are primarily found south of the latitude of Miami, in Everglades National Park, Florida Bay, Biscayne Bay, Dry Tortugas National Park and the Florida Keys. A sizable population occurs near Homestead, at the Turkey Point Nuclear Generating Station. Some individuals have been sighted in Palm Beach, Pinellas and Sarasota counties. Their range in Florida is the only place in the world where alligators and crocodiles coexist.

The current US population, estimated at 2,000 and growing, is a sign of return to the northernmost portion of their range.  There were suspicions as early as 1829 by Rafinesque that there were more than just alligators in the state, but confirmation could not be acquired until 1869, when a specimen could be brought back for examination. Records show they were plentiful in areas like Key Largo, Miami Beach, and wherever there were the appropriate mangroves for nesting and foraging. However, at the end of the 19th century, hunting them for their leather became a cottage industry in South Florida, and beginning in 1910, habitat destruction commenced on a massive scale, with the construction of a railroad designed to connect the mainland with the Keys.  Crocodile hunters, who migrated to the upper Florida Keys before and after the railroad’s construction, slaughtered almost every crocodile in northeast Florida Bay for the commercial market.  The widespread hunting did not cease until the 1970s: at one point in that decade, there were fewer than thirty total nests counted. As of 2020, further population seems to be expanding south to reclaim former habitat in the Florida Keys, where numbers are multiplying quickly, and old records indicate they once inhabited mangroves as far north as Tampa Bay.

Biology and behavior
American crocodiles are more susceptible to cold weather than American alligators. American crocodiles do not have social groups but occasionally, they congregate for feeding and basking in the daytime. While basking, they will leave their mouths wide open that exposes blood vessels in the mouth to cooler and warmer air, which helps regulate body temperature. American crocodiles, however, have a faster growth rate than alligators, and are much more tolerant of saltwater. Unlike other crocodiles, the American crocodile uses acoustic signals to communicate. Crocodile communication is centered on short-distance communications during courtship and hatching.

Cleaning symbiosis involving fish and the American crocodile has been described.

Hunting and diet

American crocodiles are apex predators, and any aquatic or terrestrial animal they encounter in freshwater, riparian and coastal saltwater habitats is potential prey.

The snout of the American crocodile is broader than some specialized fish-eating crocodilians (e.g., gharials and freshwater crocodiles), allowing it to supplement its diet with a wider variety of prey. In addition the snout gets even broader and bulkier as the animal matures, a sign for a shift in prey items. Prey species have ranged in size from the insects taken by young American crocodiles to full-grown cattle taken by large adults, and can include various birds, mammals, turtles, crabs, snails, frogs, fish, and occasionally carrion. In Haiti, hatchling and juvenile American crocodiles lived primarily off of fiddler crabs (Uca ssp.), making up 33.8% and 62.3% of the diet by weight, respectively. Elsewhere, aquatic insects and their larvae and snails are near the top of the food list for American crocodiles at this very early age. Immature and subadult American crocodiles, per a study in Mexico, have a more diverse diet that can include insects, fish, frogs, small turtles, birds and small mammals. One specimen of  had a catfish, a mourning dove and a bare-tailed woolly opossum in its stomach.

In Florida, bass, tarpon and especially mullet, large crabs, snakes, mammals that habit the riparian and coastal regions of the Everglades, such as opossums and raccoons appeared to be the primary prey of American crocodiles. In Haiti, adults appeared to live largely off of various birds, including herons, storks, flamingos, pelicans, grebes, coots and moorhens, followed by concentrations of fish including Tilapia and Cichlasoma, at times being seen to capture turtles, dogs and goats. One  adult from Honduras had stomach contents consisting of a  crocodile of its own species, a turtle shell and peccary hooves. It was noted that historically in Mexico that, among several local farmers, the capturing of livestock by American crocodiles has been a source of some conflict between humans and American crocodiles and large adults occasionally can become habitual predators of goats, dogs, pigs and cattle. In Quintana Roo, Mexico, most prey that could be determined was fish for sub-adults and adults with sub-adults having a broader prey base than either younger or adult American crocodiles. In Costa Rica, American crocodiles have been recorded hunting and killing adult female olive ridley sea turtles (Lepidochelys olivacea) when they come to nest around beaches. Reportedly, these American crocodiles hunt primarily in the first few hours after nightfall, especially on moonless nights, although they will feed at any time. It hunts in the typical way for most crocodilians, ambushing terrestrial prey when it comes to edge of the water or is sitting in shallows and dragging it down to be drowned or attempting to ambush aquatic prey from near the surface of the water.

Interspecies predatory relations
Adult American crocodiles are apex predators; they have no natural predators. They are known predators of lemon sharks, and sharks avoid areas with American crocodiles.

Usually, American alligators are dominant over and more behaviorally aggressive than American crocodiles. However, on one occasion, an American crocodile in a Florida zoo escaped its cage and started a fight with a large male American alligator in a bordering pen, and was killed. Conversely, there is one confirmed case of an American crocodile preying on a sub-adult American alligator in the wild in Florida. American alligators and American crocodiles do not often come into conflict in the wild, due largely to habitat partitioning and largely separate distributions.

There are several records of American crocodiles killing and eating spectacled caimans in South America. Areas with healthy American crocodile populations often hold only limited numbers of spectacled caimans, while conversely areas that formerly held American crocodiles but where they are now heavily depleted or are locally extinct show a growth of caiman numbers, due to less competition as well as predation. In areas of  Cuba where the two species coexist, the smaller but more aggressive Cuban crocodile is behaviorally dominant over the larger American crocodile. In Mexico, some Morelet's crocodile individuals have escaped from captivity, establishing feral populations and creating a problem for the populations of American crocodile, which must compete with this invasive species.

Reproduction
American crocodiles breed in late fall or early winter, engaging in drawn-out mating ceremonies in which males emit low-frequency bellows to attract females. In February or March, gravid females will begin to create nests of sand, mud, and dead vegetation along the water's edge. Nest location is crucial, and with the correct amount of vegetation, the eggs will develop within a small temperature range. Because sex determination is temperature-dependent in crocodilians, slight aberrations in temperature may result in all-male or all-female clutches, which would possibly harm the health of the population. About one month later, when it is time to lay, the female will dig a wide hole diagonally into the side of the nest and lay 30 to 70 eggs in it, depending on her size. After laying, the female may cover the eggs with debris or leave them uncovered.

During the 75- to 80-day incubation period, the parents will guard the nest, often inhabiting a hole in the bank nearby. Females especially have been known to guard their nests with ferocity. But in spite of these precautions, American crocodile eggs sometimes fall prey to raccoons (arguably the most virulent natural predator of crocodilian nests in the Americas), coatis, foxes, skunks or other scavenging mammals (including coyotes in Mexico and American black bears in southern Florida), as well as large predatory ants, crabs and vultures. In Panama, green iguanas were seen to dig up and prey on American crocodile eggs occasionally, although in several cases were caught by the mother American crocodile and eaten. Crocodilian eggs are somewhat brittle, but softer than bird eggs. Despite noticeable nest guarding during egg incubation, guarding of young after hatching seems to be minimal in this species.

This species exists mostly in tropical areas with distinct rainy seasons, and the young hatch near the time of the first rains of the summer (July–August) after the preceding dry season, and before the bodies of water where they live flood. In this stage of development of their young, mother American crocodiles exhibit a unique mode of parental care. During the hatching process, when the young American crocodiles are most vulnerable to predation, they will instinctively call out in soft, grunt-like croaks. These sounds trigger the female to attend to the nest, uncovering the eggs if they have been covered. Then she will aid the hatchlings in escaping their eggs and scoop them up with her mouth, carrying them to the closest water source.

It is not uncommon for the mother to care for her young even weeks after they have hatched, remaining attentive to their calls and continuing to provide transportation. About five weeks after hatching, the young American crocodiles disband in search of their own independent lives. Most of them will not survive, being preyed upon by several types of raptorial birds, other reptiles, and large fishes (e.g., barred catfish, Atlantic tarpons, common snook and lemon sharks, boa constrictors, black spiny-tailed iguanas and spectacled caimans). Those that do survive grow rapidly, feeding on insects, fish and frogs. Additionally, some young American crocodiles feed on each other.

Conservation status

The International Union for Conservation of Nature (IUCN) lists the species as vulnerable, but it has not been assessed since 1996. On March 20, 2007, the United States Fish and Wildlife Service declassified the American crocodile as an endangered species, changing its status to "threatened". It remains protected from poaching and killing under the federal Endangered Species Act. NatureServe considers the Florida population "Imperiled".

Because of hide hunting, pollution, loss of habitat, and commercial farming, the American crocodile is endangered in parts of its range. As a result of overhunting in the 1950s and 1960s, Venezuela banned commercial crocodile skin harvesting for a decade starting in 1972. In southern Florida, about two-thirds of American crocodile deaths are attributed to road collisions, about 10% to intentional killing, and only about 5% to natural causes.   In recent years in Jamaica there has been rampant poaching of the species for their meat and there has been a significant population drop compounded by the lack of action by the government. On Hispaniola, they were once found throughout the island, but currently, the only confirmed remaining presence is at the two largest lakes on the island: Etang Saumâtre in Haiti, and Lago Enriquillo in the Dominican Republic.

An estimated 1,000 to 2,000 American crocodiles live in Mexico, Central America and South America, but population data is limited. An additional 500 to 1,200 are believed to live in southern Florida.

Relationship with humans

Attacks by American crocodiles have been reported in Mexico, Costa Rica, and Panama. The American crocodile rates somewhere in the middle of all crocodilians temperamentally. A study by the IUCN found that it has the highest incidence of reported attacks on humans of any of the crocodilians from the Americas, but fatalities were rare. The species usually does not attack people as regularly as Old World crocodiles do; the estimated number of attacks is considerably smaller than those by the saltwater (C. porosus) and Nile crocodiles (C. niloticus), which are considered the most aggressive crocodilians towards humans. Particular to this species, it is noted for having a shy demeanor and clearly does not want anything to do with humans; it will not stand its ground and will flee humans at the very sight of them. The Cuban crocodile (C. rhombifer) is rather more aggressive in interspecies interactions than the American crocodile and attacks and displaces American crocodiles when they are kept in mixed species enclosures at zoos or at crocodile farms together, despite being smaller than the American species. However, attacks on humans are rarely reported in Cuban crocodiles, due to its much more limited habitat and range.

In May 2007, two instances occurred within one week of children being attacked and killed by this species—one in Mexico just south of Puerto Vallarta and one in Costa Rica. On August 24, 2014, a man and a woman were swimming in a canal in Gables by the Sea, a community in Coral Gables, Florida, at 02:00, a canal where crocodiles were known to occur, when they were bitten in the shoulder and the hand by an American crocodile. (Florida Fish & Wildlife Conservation Commission, Crocodile Response Program) This was the first documented wild crocodile attack on humans in Florida since records of human-crocodile conflict have been kept. There have reportedly been 36 American crocodile attacks on humans from 1995 to 2017 in the Cancun area of southeastern Mexico.

See also

 American alligator
 Orinoco crocodile

Notes

References

External links

 University of Florida's crocodile research in Southwest Florida

Media
 Crocodylus acutus at CalPhotos
 ARKive images and movies of the American crocodile (Crocodylus acutus)

Apex predators
Crocodilians of North America
Crocodilians of South America
Crocodylidae
ESA threatened species
Natural history of Florida
Reptiles described in 1807
Taxa named by Georges Cuvier
Reptiles of the Caribbean
Reptiles of Belize
Reptiles of Colombia
Reptiles of Costa Rica
Reptiles of Cuba
Reptiles of the Dominican Republic
Reptiles of Ecuador
Reptiles of El Salvador
Reptiles of Guatemala
Reptiles of Haiti
Reptiles of Honduras
Reptiles of Jamaica
Reptiles of Mexico
Reptiles of Nicaragua
Reptiles of North America
Reptiles of Panama
Reptiles of Peru
Reptiles of Trinidad and Tobago
Reptiles of Venezuela
Vulnerable animals